The Ilyushin Il-78 (NATO reporting name Midas) is a Soviet/Russian four-engined aerial refueling tanker based on the Il-76 strategic airlifter.

Design and development

The Soviet Union's first dedicated tanker aircraft were variants of preexisting bombers, like the Tupolev Tu-16 and Myasishchev M-4. Their performance was deemed insufficient, especially so since new bomber models were slated to enter service (the Tupolev Tu-22M and the Tupolev Tu-160). In 1968, the development of a brand-new tanker started, taking the Ilyushin Il-76 as a basis. However, its performances were insufficient for use as a tanker: it could only transfer less than 10 tonnes of fuel to other aircraft. Instead of the basic Il-76, the improved Il-76MD version was chosen as the basis for the new tanker, named Il-78, thanks to its higher fuel capacity. The Il-78 tanker was developed and designed in the Ilyushin Aviation Complex in the Soviet Union. The Il-78 made its first flight on 26 June 1983, and it officially entered service in June 1987. Meanwhile, work on a version with a higher fuel capacity started. This version was called Il-78M, and it first flew on 7 March 1987. In total, 32 Il-78s, 13 Il-78Ms and a single Il-78E (a version exported to Libya) were built at the Tashkent Aviation Production Association, from 1984 to 1993.

Taking the Il-76MD as its basis, the Il-78 airframe retains its general configuration. The tail turret is removed, and an air refuelling operator is situated in the rear gunner's position. Three aerial refueling pods are added: one under each wing, and one fixed to the rear fuselage. The basic Il-78 use three UPAZ-1 pods, while the Il-78M uses two UPAZ-1s under the wings, and one UPAZ-1M on the rear fuselage (the UPAZ-1M has a superior fuel transfer rate). The underwing pods are used to refuel tactical aircraft, while the fuselage one is used for heavier aircraft. The Il-78 uses the probe-and-drogue refueling method. The Il-78 can transfer fuel from its internal tanks, and two removable tanks located in the cargo hold. The Il-78M has three fixed tanks in its cargo hold. The basic Il-78 can transfer a maximum of 57.7 tonnes of fuel (internal tanks only) or 85.7 tonnes with the additional tanks, while the Il-78M can transfer 105.7 tonnes.

Variants
Il-78 Original production version based on the Il-76MD. With the additional fuel tanks removed, the Il-78 can serve as a regular cargo aircraft.
Il-78M The Il-78M entered service in 1987 as a dedicated tanker equipped with three permanent fuselage tanks, a higher gross weight of 210 tonnes, and no cargo door or cargo handling equipment. The cargo ramp is retained but non-functional. Total fuel capacity is 138 tonnes (303,600 lb), of which 105.7 tonnes (232,540 lb) is transferable.
Il-78-2 Modernization of Il-78/78M aircraft, using same parts as used in newly produced Il-78M-90A and Il-76MD-90A variants, to enhance service life from 30 to 40 years. The cockpit equipment is modernised, and flare launchers are installed. The aircraft have three UPAZ-1M air refuelling pods. The first modernized aircraft was rolled out on 25 August 2019.
Il-78M-90A (Il-478) An upgraded variant based on the Il-76MD-90A. First prototype was rolled out on 29 November 2017, and performed its maiden flight on 25 January 2018. On December 12, 2020, an order for 10 Il-78M-90As was signed, with the serial production starting in 2021.
Il-78E Export version of the Il-78. One example built for Libya.
Il-78MKI Export version for India. Six aircraft were ordered in 2002, built at the Tashkent Aviation Production Association plant using unfinished airframes. Uses Cobham Mk.32B air refuelling pods, which allow to refuel both Russian-built and Western aircraft.
Il-78MP Multi-role aerial refuelling tanker/transport aircraft, with removable fuel tanks in cargo hold and three UPAZ-1 refuelling pods, for the Pakistan Air Force.

Refueling capability

Operators

Current operators

 Algerian Air Force – six Il-78s bought from Ukraine in 1998, delivered between 1998 and 2003 after servicing in Russia. Four Il-78s in service as of 2017.

 Chinese Air Force – three Il-78s ordered to Ukraine in 2011, delivered between 2014 and 2016 after overhauls. These aircraft are fitted with UPAZ-1 pods.

 Indian Air Force – six Il-78MKIs delivered in 2003 and 2004, operated by No. 78 Squadron at Agra AFS.

 Pakistan Air Force – four Il-78s were ordered from Ukrainian surplus stocks in 2006, fitted with removable fuel tanks and UPAZ refueling pods. They were delivered between 2009 and 2011 after being overhauled at the Mykolaiv aircraft repair plant. These aircraft received the designation Il-78MP.
No. 10 Squadron "Bulls"

 Russian Air Force – 19 Il-78/78Ms in service as of 2019.
43rd Center for Combat Application and Training of Aircrew for Long Range Aviation – Dyagilevo (air base), Ryazan Oblast
203rd Guards Air Refueling Regiment
United States

The US Company, Meridican, Inc, privately owned IL-78, was going through engineering changes in 2022 to upgrade its air to air refueling pods, hose and drogue system, to a Western-manufactured system which is compatible with US Navy and NATO.

Former operators

 National Air Force of Angola – one ordered from Ukraine in 2001. Refueling equipment was removed and the aircraft rebuilt into an Il-76TD before it was sent to Angola in 2003. Scrapped in 2014.

 Libyan Air Force – one Il-78E bought in 1989. This aircraft was destroyed in 2015 in an attack on Mitiga International Airport.

 Soviet Air Forces – aircraft were transferred to the Russian and Ukrainian Air Forces after the dissolution of the Soviet Union.
 106th Heavy Bomber Aviation Division – Uzyn Air Base, Kyiv Oblast, Ukrainian SSR
 409th Aviation Regiment of tanker aircraft

 Ukrainian Air Force – inherited 21 Il-78s after the collapse of the Soviet Union. Since 1993, some of the aircraft were disposed of their refueling equipment and used as cargo aircraft, others were sold to Algeria, India, Pakistan and China for air refueling operations.
 106th Heavy Bomber Aviation Division – Uzyn Air Base, Kyiv Oblast
 409th Aviation Regiment of tanker aircraft

 An Il-78 of the Ukrainian Air Force was bought and imported by North American Tactical Aviation Inc (NATA) in 2005, and flown to the United States in July 2006 with an intention to use the aircraft for contracted air refueling operations to United States military. The aircraft latter passed under ownership of the Air Support Systems LLC and got an American civilian registration N78GF. Afterwards, it was mothballed at the North Texas Regional Airport, Texas for 2.5 years. In 2009, it departed from the airport with a Ukrainian crew hired by NATA and was heading to the Wittman Regional Airport, Wisconsin to refuel before leaving the United States on the way to Pakistan for phase aircraft maintenance. However, it was diverted to the Sawyer International Airport, Michigan where it is grounded until now. In 2010, the aircraft was repossessed by the Bank of Utah Trustee and in 2019 sold to Meridican Inc, an international consulting firm in Philadelphia, Pennsylvania.  The aircraft was to receive a cockpit upgrade for international operations in 2018.

Specifications (Il-78M)

See also

References

Notes

Bibliography

External links

Il-78 at aviation.ru
Museum of 203 regiment 
 Role of IL-78 strategic tanker in Pakistan Air Force www.PAFwallpapers.com
IL-78MKI Midas at indian military database

Il-078
1980s Soviet military tanker aircraft
Quadjets
High-wing aircraft
T-tail aircraft
Aircraft first flown in 1983